"Your Loving Arms" is a song by German singer Billie Ray Martin, the former lead singer of Electribe 101. It was released in October 1994 as the first single from her debut solo album, Deadline for My Memories (1995). Written by Martin and David Harrow, it is known to be one of her most notable singles. It was produced by English electronic dance group the Grid and was originally released on 31 October 1994. The track found greater chart success in 1995, when it peaked at number one in Italy and on the US Billboard Hot Dance Club Songs chart, and number six on the UK Singles Chart. On the Eurochart Hot 100, it reached number 21. There were made two different music videos for the song. Mixmag featured "Your Loving Arms" in its "100 Greatest Dance Singles of All Time" list in 1996.

Chart performance

"Your Loving Arms" was a major hit in Europe and remains Ray Martin's most successful song to date. It went to number-one in Italy and was a top 10 hit in Ireland, Scotland and the United Kingdom, where it peaked at number six in its second week on the UK Singles Chart, on May 21, 1995. But on the UK Dance Chart, the single reached number two. On the Eurochart Hot 100, "Your Loving Arms" peaked at number 21 on June 3, 1995. Outside Europe, it hit number-one on the US Billboard Dance Club Songs chart, number five in Israel, number nine in Canada and number 85 in Australia in November 1995. Additionally, the single also went to number 46 on the US Billboard Hot 100 and number 30 on the US Cash Box Top 100 in 1996. It received a silver record in the United Kingdom with a sale of 200,000 singles.

Critical reception
"Your Loving Arms" received favorable reviews from music critics. AllMusic editor John Bush described it as a "magical" electro-pop track. On the 1994 release, Larry Flick from Billboard declared it "a spirited foray into trancecarpeted hi-NRG territory. Her distinctively creamy voice has seldom sounded so strong and worldly, giving the song's romantic prose a decidedly dark and anxious edge." In 1995, he added it as "an NRGetic dance number that makes excellent use of her milky soprano range. Her torchy style makes an intriguing contrast with the Grid's cool and rigid groove production." He also called it "deliciously dramatic". Dave Sholin from the Gavin Report remarked that "there's something in Billie Ray's voice that is simply magnetic. This one-time member of London's Electribe 101 releases a lot of electricity on her own as proven by one super hot dance track." Ross Jones from The Guardian complimented the singer as the "owner of this era's most haunting voice". He wrote, "At first, this high-octane disco spinner doesn't seem like the best place for her Marlene-meets-Aretha tones, but listen closely and try imagining anyone else caressing it so lovingly, with such unassailable cool." On the re-release, he called it a "glowing piece of dancefloor TNT". Another editor, Sam Wollaston noted the "upbeat handbag house on the blissful dancefloor anthem".

John Hamilton from Idolator described it as "fiery" and "a predestined club classic, a pulsating techno torch song in which Martin sasses, vamps, and pleads over ominous rising chords and a frantic tambourine-inflected beat." Howard Cohen from Knight Ridder said that "an instantly memorable hook, retro-disco beat and warm, inviting vocals make this the most musical dance offering 1995 has offered so far." In his weekly UK chart commentary, James Masterton commented, "Her first solo hit is more of what she has become known for, a haunting, slinky piece of dance music that is so good as to be utterly uncommercial." Pan-European magazine Music & Media wrote, "Is there such a thing as adult-orientated pop dance? If there isn't yet, then it is debuting right here thanks to a lady who looks like Marianne Faithfull's twin sister with the voice of Carly Simon." James Hamilton from Music Week'''s RM Dance Update deemed it "mournful" and "husky". Barry Walters from Spin stated that it "was the pop song with underground credibility, one that everyone could agree had something special. Martin's lyrics speak of profound joy and pain, the melody soars through consciousness like a caress, and the vocal sets itself apart from the wailing of generic gut-busting divas."

Music video
There were made two different music videos for the song. The UK version is in black-and-white and features Ray Martin performing the song in a bedroom, sometimes lying on the bed or sitting in a chair. Other scenes features the singer walking in a garden or dancing with a man in a hallway. The second version is made in colours. The UK version was later published on YouTube in 2014. 

Impact and legacy
British electronic and clubbing magazine Mixmag ranked "Your Loving Arms" number 47 in its list of the "100 Greatest Dance Singles of All Time" in 1996. They wrote,

Same year, the song received one of ASCAP's Rhythm & Soul Awards, and Ray Martin was awarded the prize for Best New Dance Solo Artist of 1995 at the International Dance Music Awards in Miami.Idolator ranked it one of "The 50 Best Pop Singles of 1995" in 2015.Time Out'' ranked it number 29 in their list of "The 50 Best Gay Songs to Celebrate Pride All Year Long" in 2022. They added,

Track listings

Charts

Weekly charts

Year-end charts

Certifications

Release history

See also
 List of number-one dance singles of 1995 (U.S.)

References

External links
 

1994 singles
1994 songs
1995 singles
Black-and-white music videos
Electronic songs
House music songs
Magnet Records singles
Number-one singles in Italy
Sire Records singles